The men's foil was one of eight fencing events on the fencing at the 1976 Summer Olympics programme. It was the seventeenth appearance of the event. The competition was held from July 20 to 21, 1976. A total of 56 fencers from 23 nations competed. Nations had been limited to three fencers each since 1928. The event was won by Fabio Dal Zotto of Italy, the nation's first victory in the men's foil since 1936 and fifth overall (second all-time behind France's seven). Italy had not reached the podium in the event since 1956. Aleksandr Romankov's silver was the Soviet Union's first medal in the event since 1960. In contrast, France won its fourth consecutive bronze medal with Bernard Talvard's third-place finish.

Background

This was the 17th appearance of the event, which has been held at every Summer Olympics except 1908 (when there was a foil display only rather than a medal event). Five of the six finalists from 1972 returned (all except champion Witold Woyda of Poland): two-time silver medalist (and 1964 fifth-place finisher) Jenő Kamuti of Hungary, bronze medalist (and 1968 finalist) Christian Noël of France, fourth-place finisher (and 1968 finalist) Mihai Țiu of Romania, fifth-place finisher Vladimir Denisov of the Soviet Union, and sixth-place finisher Marek Dąbrowski of Poland. Noël had won the 1973 and 1975 world championships; Aleksandr Romankov of the Soviet Union was the 1974 champion.

Kuwait made its debut in the men's foil; East Germany competed separately for the first time. The United States made its 16th appearance, most of any nation, having missed only the inaugural 1896 competition.

Competition format

The 1976 tournament returned to a mix of pool and knockout rounds similar to that used in 1968, after the 1972 edition briefly used a pool-only format. The competition included three pool rounds, followed by a double-elimination knockout round, finishing with a final pool round. In each pool round, the fencers competed in a round-robin.

Bouts in the round-robin pools were to 5 touches; bouts in the double-elimination round were to 10 touches. Repechages were not used in the first three rounds, but were used to determine medalists if necessary in the final.

Schedule

All times are Eastern Daylight Time (UTC-4)

Results

Round 1

Round 1 Pool A

Round 1 Pool B

Round 1 Pool C

Round 1 Pool D

Round 1 Pool E

Round 1 Pool F

Round 1 Pool G

Round 1 Pool H

Round 1 Pool I

Round 2

Round 2 Pool A

Round 2 Pool B

Round 2 Pool C

Round 2 Pool D

Round 2 Pool E

Round 2 Pool F

Round 3

Round 3 Pool A

Round 3 Pool B

Round 3 Pool C

Round 3 Pool D

Double elimination rounds

Winners brackets

Winners group 1

Winners group 2

Winners group 3

Winners group 4

Losers brackets

Losers group 1

Losers group 2

Final round 

Dal Zotto and Romankov each finished with 4 wins and 1 loss in the pool (with Romankov's loss being to Dal Zotto; Dal Zotto had been beaten by Talvard). They faced off again in the barrage to determine the gold and silver medals; Dal Zotto again defeated Romankov, 5–1.

 Barrage

Final classification

References

Foil men
Men's events at the 1976 Summer Olympics